Bernard J. Dowd (1891–1971) was Mayor of the City of Buffalo, New York, serving 1946–1949.  He was born in Buffalo's First Ward on December 5, 1891. He graduated from high school around 1915 and entered the University of Buffalo School of Pharmacy. He entered World War I in May 1918 as a sergeant in Company G, 309th Infantry, 78 Division. He was gassed in the Battle of Saint-Mihiel and reported dead. In May 1919, Dowd returned to Buffalo honorably discharged from the service. He graduated from pharmacy school and opened Dowd's Pharmacy located after 1940 at 110 Potomac Avenue, at the corner of DeWitt Street. He married Grace J. Nolan on October 22, 1922.

He was elected mayor on November 6, 1945, as the Republican candidate. On May 9, 1946, Mayor Dowd was in Washington, D.C. where he met President Harry S. Truman and accepted the National Safety Council award for "safest large city in 1945." After his term ended, he worked as a pharmacist. He was defeated in the 1951 Republican primary for Common Council President. He died on November 1, 1971 in Veteran's Hospital after a long illness.

References

1891 births
1971 deaths
Mayors of Buffalo, New York
New York (state) Republicans
20th-century American politicians